Eurasia was a girl group from the Philippines, created by the entertainment company Viva Entertainment. They took the name of "Eurasia" as its members are a mix of both European and Asian (3 members are half Filipino & half European while 2 members are Asian - one full Filipino and one Filipino & part Japanese). In 2010, they launched their career by appearing on the music variety show Party Pilipinas. Their debut album was released in 2010.

Members
Initial lineup
 Kristine Nieto (2009-2013)
 Gail Nicolas (2009–2012)
 Sara Polverini (2009–2012)
 Lana Roi (2009–2013)
 Kelly Gamboa (2009–2012)
Second lineup
 Phoebe (2012-2016)
 Krisha (2013-2015)
 Julian (2012-2016)
 Akiko (2013–2016)
 Pamela (2012-2016)

Discography

Studio albums

See also
VIVA Entertainment
VIVA Records

References

2009 establishments in the Philippines
Filipino girl groups
Filipino pop music groups
Musical groups established in 2009
Musical groups disestablished in 2016
Viva Records (Philippines) artists